The 2019–20 Denver Nuggets season was the 44th season of the franchise in the National Basketball Association (NBA), and the franchise's 53rd season of existence overall.

The season was suspended by the league officials following the games of March 11 after it was reported that Rudy Gobert tested positive for COVID-19. On March 19, the Nuggets announced that one person from the team tested positive for COVID-19. The Nuggets were one of the 22 teams invited to the NBA Bubble on June 4.

In the playoffs, the Nuggets became the first team in playoffs history to come back from a 3–1 series deficit twice in the same playoff run. The Nuggets defeated the Utah Jazz in the first round in seven games, recovering from a 3–1 series deficit and advancing to the semifinals against the Los Angeles Clippers, whom they last faced in the playoffs in 2006. The Nuggets defeated the Los Angeles Clippers in the Conference Semifinals, also recovering from a 3–1 series deficit, where they subsequently advanced to the Conference Finals. In achieving this feat, the Nuggets became the first team in NBA history to ever recover from two 3–1 series deficits in the same postseason to advance to the next round; no previous team had ever even forced two Game 7s in that situation. The Nuggets advanced to their first Conference Finals since the 2008–09 season and faced the Los Angeles Lakers in a rematch of the 2009 Conference Finals in which the Lakers won in six games. This time, the Nuggets lost in five games. Like in 2009, the Lakers went on to win the championship.

Draft

The Denver Nuggets did not hold any picks for the 2019 NBA Draft, but traded for the 44th pick from the Miami Heat, who selected center Bol Bol.

Roster

Standings

Division

Conference

Game log

Preseason
The preseason schedule was announced on July 23, 2019.

|- style="background:#cfc"
| 1
| October 8
| @ Portland
| 
| Paul Millsap (14)
| Millsap, Plumlee, Beasley, Craig, Vanderbilt (5)
| Monté Morris (4)
| Veterans Memorial Coliseum10,942
| 1–0
|- style="background:#cfc"
| 2
| October 10
| @ LA Clippers
| 
| Malik Beasley (16)
| Nikola Jokić (11)
| Mason Plumlee (6)
| Staples Center15,778
| 2–0
|- style="background:#cfc"
| 3
| October 14
| @ Phoenix
| 
| Jerami Grant (22)
| Jamal Murray (8)
| Murray, Plumlee (6)
| Talking Stick Resort Arena8,075
| 3–0
|- style="background:#cfc"
| 4
| October 17
| Portland
| 
| Millsap, Barton (13)
| Mason Plumlee (6)
| Jamal Murray (6)
| Pepsi Center14,424
| 4–0

Regular season 

|- style="background:#cfc"
| 1
| October 23
| @ Portland
| 
| Nikola Jokić (20)
| Nikola Jokić (13)
| Jamal Murray (6)
| Moda Center19,991
| 1–0
|- style="background:#cfc"
| 2
| October 25
| Phoenix
| 
| Jamal Murray (27)
| Nikola Jokić (14)
| Nikola Jokić (12)
| Pepsi Center19,557
| 2–0
|- style="background:#cfc"
| 3
| October 28
| @ Sacramento
| 
| Jamal Murray (18)
| Nikola Jokić (13)
| Barton, Murray, Grant, Plumlee (3)
| Golden 1 Center15,870
| 3–0
|- style="background:#fcc"
| 4
| October 29
| Dallas
| 
| Paul Millsap (23)
| Will Barton (11)
| Nikola Jokić (10)
| Pepsi Center16,605
| 3–1
|- style="background:#fcc"
| 5 
| October 31
| @ New Orleans
| 
| Michael Porter Jr. (15)
| Mason Plumlee (7)
| Murray, Jokić (6)
| Smoothie King Center16,613
| 3–2

|- style="background:#cfc"
| 6
| November 2
| @ Orlando
| 
| Jamal Murray (22)
| Paul Millsap (11)
| Harris, Jokić (4)
| Amway Center17,025
| 4–2
|- style="background:#cfc"
| 7
| November 5
| Miami
| 
| Jamal Murray (21)
| Will Barton (10)
| Monté Morris (8)
| Pepsi Center18,010
| 5–2
|- style="background:#cfc"
| 8
| November 8
| Philadelphia
| 
| Nikola Jokić (26)
| Nikola Jokić (11)
| Jamal Murray (11)
| Pepsi Center19,520
| 6–2
|- style="background:#cfc"
| 9 
| November 10
| @ Minnesota
| 
| Nikola Jokić (20)
| Will Barton (12)
| Nikola Jokić (7)
| Target Center13,553
| 7–2
|- style="background:#fcc"
| 10
| November 12
| Atlanta
| 
| Will Barton (21)
| Will Barton (9)
| Jamal Murray (8)
| Pepsi Center18,327
| 7–3
|- style="background:#cfc"
| 11 
| November 14
| Brooklyn
| 
| Jokić, Millsap (18)
| Nikola Jokić (10)
| Monté Morris (7)
| Pepsi Center18,394
| 8–3
|- style="background:#cfc"
| 12
| November 17
| @ Memphis
| 
| Jamal Murray (39)
| Mason Plumlee (7)
| Jokić, Murray (8)
| FedEx Forum14,227
| 9–3
|- style="background:#cfc"
| 13
| November 20
| Houston
| 
| Nikola Jokić (27)
| Nikola Jokić (12)
| Jamal Murray (9)
| Pepsi Center17,778
| 10–3
|- style="background:#cfc"
| 14 
| November 22
| Boston
| 
| Jamal Murray (22)
| Nikola Jokić (16)
| Nikola Jokić (10)
| Pepsi Center19,520
| 11–3
|- style="background:#cfc"
| 15
| November 24
| Phoenix
| 
| Paul Millsap (23)
| Nikola Jokić (13)
| Nikola Jokić (5)
| Pepsi Center19,520
| 12–3
|- style="background:#cfc"
| 16
| November 26
| Washington
| 
| Jerami Grant (20)
| Nikola Jokić (20)
| Will Barton (8)
| Pepsi Center18,673
| 13–3
|- style="background:#fcc"
| 17 
| November 30
| @ Sacramento
| 
| Gary Harris (25)
| Will Barton (12)
| Jokić, Murray (6)
| Golden 1 Center17,583
| 13–4

|- style="background:#fcc"
| 18
| December 3
| L. A. Lakers
| 
| Jamal Murray (22)
| Paul Millsap (8)
| Nikola Jokić (8)
| Pepsi Center19,658
| 13–5
|- style="background:#cfc"
| 19
| December 5
| @ New York
| 
| Will Barton (17)
| Mason Plumlee (11)
| Nikola Jokić (8)
| Madison Square Garden18,171
| 14–5
|- style="background:#fcc"
| 20
| December 6
| @ Boston
| 
| Nikola Jokić (30)
| Nikola Jokić (10)
| Harris, Jokić (4)
| TD Garden19,156
| 14–6
|- style="background:#fcc"
| 21 
| December 8
| @ Brooklyn
| 
| Nikola Jokić (24)
| Nikola Jokić (11)
| Nikola Jokić (6)
| Barclays Center16,679
| 14–7
|- style="background:#fcc"
| 22
| December 10
| @ Philadelphia
| 
| Will Barton (26)
| Barton, Jokić (7)
| Nikola Jokić (11)
| Wells Fargo Center20,591
| 14–8
|- style="background:#cfc"
| 23 
| December 12
| Portland
| 
| Grant, Jokić (20)
| Barton, Jokić (11)
| Monte Morris (7)
| Pepsi Center18,828
| 15–8
|- style="background:#cfc"
| 24 
| December 14
| Oklahoma City
| 
| Nikola Jokić (28)
| Nikola Jokić (14)
| Nikola Jokić (12)
| Pepsi Center19,520
| 16–8
|- style="background:#cfc"
| 25 
| December 15
| New York
| 
| Nikola Jokić (25)
| Nikola Jokić (10)
| Mason Plumlee (6)
| Pepsi Center18,867
| 17–8
|- style="background:#cfc"
| 26
| December 18
| Orlando
| 
| Jamal Murray (33)
| Paul Millsap (12)
| Nikola Jokić (12)
| Pepsi Center18,182
| 18–8
|- style="background:#cfc"
| 27
| December 20
| Minnesota
| 
| Jamal Murray (28)
| Nikola Jokić (10)
| Nikola Jokić (10)
| Pepsi Center19,520
| 19–8
|- style="background:#cfc"
| 28 
| December 22
| @ L. A. Lakers
| 
| Paul Millsap (21)
| Will Barton (13)
| Barton, Harris, Jokić, Murray, Plumlee (5)
| Staples Center18,997
| 20–8
|- style="background:#cfc"
| 29
| December 23
| @ Phoenix
| 
| Jamal Murray (28)
| Nikola Jokić (12)
| Nikola Jokić (10)
| Talking Stick Resort Arena16,041
| 21–8
|- style="background:#fcc"
| 30
| December 25
| New Orleans
| 
| Nikola Jokić (23)
| Nikola Jokić (10)
| Monte Morris (6)
| Pepsi Center19,520
| 21–9
|- style="background:#cfc"
| 31 
| December 28
| Memphis
| 
| Nikola Jokić (31)
| Nikola Jokić (10)
| Nikola Jokić (10)
| Pepsi Center19,697
| 22–9
|- style="background:#cfc"
| 32 
| December 29
| Sacramento
| 
| Barton, Porter Jr. (19)
| Nikola Jokić (8)
| Jamal Murray (7)
| Pepsi Center19,520
| 23–9
|- style="background:#fcc"
| 33 
| December 31
| @ Houston 
| 
| Nikola Jokić (21)
| Barton, Millsap (9)
| Will Barton (7)
| Toyota Center18,055
| 23–10

|- style="background:#cfc"
| 34
| January 2
| @ Indiana
| 
| Michael Porter Jr. (25)
| Will Barton (10)
| Jamal Murray (7)
| Bankers Life Fieldhouse16,688
| 24–10
|- style="background:#fcc"
| 35
| January 4
| @ Washington
| 
| Jamal Murray (39)
| Nikola Jokić (10)
| Jokić, Murray (4)
| Capital One Arena16,233
| 24–11
|- style="background:#cfc"
| 36
| January 6
| @ Atlanta
| 
| Nikola Jokić (47)
| Will Barton (9)
| Jamal Murray (8)
| State Farm Arena15,286
| 25–11
|- style="background:#cfc"
| 37
| January 8
| @ Dallas
| 
| Nikola Jokić (33)
| Juan Hernangómez (7)
| Nikola Jokić (7)
| American Airlines Center20,314
| 26–11
|- style="background:#fcc"
| 38
| January 11
| Cleveland 
| 
| Jamal Murray (24)
| Nikola Jokić (12)
| Nikola Jokić (5)
| Pepsi Center19,533
| 26–12
|- style="background:#cfc"
| 39 
| January 12
| L. A. Clippers
| 
| Nikola Jokić (20)
| Nikola Jokić (15)
| Jokić, Morris (6)
| Pepsi Center19,520
| 27–12
|- style="background:#cfc"
| 40 
| January 15
| Charlotte
| 
| Michael Porter Jr. (19)
| Jokić, Porter Jr. (8)
| Nikola Jokić (8)
| Pepsi Center19,520
| 28–12
|- style="background:#cfc"
| 41 
| January 16
| @ Golden State
| 
| Will Barton (31)
| Mason Plumlee (15)
| Nikola Jokić (8)
| Chase Center18,064
| 29–12
|- style="background:#fcc"
| 42 
| January 19
| Indiana
| 
| Nikola Jokić (30)
| Nikola Jokić (10)
| Barton, Morris (5)
| Pepsi Center19,520
| 29–13
|- style="background:#cfc"
| 43 
| January 20
| @ Minnesota
| 
| Michael Porter Jr. (20)
| Michael Porter Jr. (14)
| Monte Morris (8)
| Target Center12,172
| 30–13
|- style="background:#fcc"
| 44 
| January 22
| @ Houston
| 
| Nikola Jokić (19)
| Nikola Jokić (12)
| Nikola Jokić (10)
| Toyota Center18,055
| 30–14
|- style="background:#cfc"
| 45 
| January 24
| @ New Orleans
| 
| Nikola Jokić (27)
| Nikola Jokić (12)
| Nikola Jokić (7)
| Smoothie King Center16,398
| 31–14
|- style="background:#cfc"
| 46
| January 26
| Houston
| 
| Jerami Grant (25)
| Nikola Jokić (12)
| Nikola Jokić (11)
| Pepsi Center19,520
| 32–14
|- style="background:#fcc"
| 47
| January 28
| @ Memphis
| 
| Nikola Jokić (25)
| Nikola Jokić (13)
| Monté Morris (6)
| FedEx Forum14,365
| 32–15
|- style="background:#cfc"
| 48 
| January 30
| Utah
| 
| Nikola Jokić (28)
| Michael Porter Jr. (12)
| Nikola Jokić (10)
| Pepsi Center19,520
| 33–15
|- style="background:#cfc"
| 49 
| January 31
| @ Milwaukee
| 
| Will Barton (24)
| Michael Porter Jr. (11)
| Nikola Jokić (9)
| Fiserv Forum18,141
| 34–15

|- style="background:#fcc"
| 50
| February 2
| @ Detroit
| 
| Nikola Jokić (39)
| Nikola Jokić (10)
| Nikola Jokić (11)
| Little Caesars Arena15,488
| 34–16
|- style="background:#cfc"
| 51
| February 4
| Portland
| 
| Nikola Jokić (29)
| Nikola Jokić (13)
| Nikola Jokić (9)
| Pepsi Center19,520
| 35–16
|- style="background:#cfc"
| 52 
| February 5
| @ Utah
| 
| Jamal Murray (31)
| Nikola Jokić (21)
| Nikola Jokić (10)
| Vivint Smart Home Arena18,306
| 36–16
|- style="background:#cfc"
| 53
| February 8
| @ Phoenix
| 
| Jamal Murray (36)
| Paul Millsap (11)
| Nikola Jokić (6)
| Talking Stick Resort Arena16,843
| 37–16
|- style="background:#cfc"
| 54
| February 10
| San Antonio
| 
| Jamal Murray (26)
| Nikola Jokić (8)
| Nikola Jokić (13)
| Pepsi Center19,520
| 38–16
|- style="background:#fcc"
| 55
| February 12
| L. A. Lakers
| 
| Jamal Murray (32)
| Nikola Jokić (11)
| Jamal Murray (10)
| Pepsi Center19,860
| 38–17
|- align="center"
|colspan="9" bgcolor="#bbcaff"|All-Star Break
|- style="background:#fcc"
| 56 
| February 21
| @ Oklahoma City
| 
| Nikola Jokić (32)
| Will Barton (9)
| Barton, Jokić (5)
| Chesapeake Energy Arena18,203
| 38–18
|- style="background:#cfc"
| 57
| February 23
| Minnesota
| 
| Paul Millsap (25)
| Jokić, Millsap (7)
| 4 tied (6)
| Pepsi Center19,626
| 39–18
|- style="background:#cfc"
| 58
| February 25
| Detroit
| 
| Jerami Grant (29)
| Michael Porter Jr. (8)
| Jamal Murray (8)
| Pepsi Center19,143
| 40–18
|- style="background:#fcc"
| 59
| February 28
| @ L. A. Clippers
| 
| Nikola Jokić (21)
| Nikola Jokić (9)
| Will Barton (4)
| Staples Center19,068
| 40–19

|- style="background:#cfc"
| 60
| March 1
| Toronto
| 
| Nikola Jokić (23)
| Nikola Jokić (18)
| Nikola Jokić (11)
| Pepsi Center19,777
| 41–19
|- style="background:#fcc"
| 61
| March 3
| Golden State
| 
| Barton, Millsap (18)
| Nikola Jokić (13)
| Nikola Jokić (7)
| Pepsi Center19,520
| 41–20
|- style="background:#cfc"
| 62
| March 5
| @ Charlotte
| 
| Jamal Murray (18)
| Nikola Jokić (11)
| Nikola Jokić (8)
| Spectrum Center13,311
| 42–20
|- style="background:#fcc"
| 63
| March 7
| @ Cleveland
| 
| Will Barton (22)
| Barton, Jokić (8)
| Nikola Jokić (8)
| Rocket Mortgage FieldHouse19,432
| 42–21
|- style="background:#cfc"
| 64
| March 9
| Milwaukee
| 
| Jamal Murray (21)
| Paul Millsap (10)
| Nikola Jokić (7)
| Pepsi Center19,838
| 43–21
|- style="background:#fcc"
| 65
| March 11
| @ Dallas
| 
| Jamal Murray (25)
| Nikola Jokić (13)
| Nikola Jokić (8)
| American Airlines Center20,302
| 43–22

|- style="background:#fcc;"
| 66
| August 1
| Miami
| 
| Grant, Jokić (19)
| Nikola Jokić (7)
| Nikola Jokić (6)
| HP Field HouseNo In-Person Attendance
| 43–23
|- style="background:#cfc;"
| 67
| August 3
| @ Oklahoma City
| 
| Michael Porter Jr. (37)
| Jokić, Porter (12)
| Nikola Jokić (10)
| The ArenaNo In-Person Attendance
| 44–23
|- style="background:#cfc;"
| 68
| August 5
| @ San Antonio
| 
| Michael Porter Jr. (30)
| Michael Porter Jr. (15)
| Nikola Jokić (11)
| Visa Athletic CenterNo In-Person Attendance
| 45–23
|- style="background:#fcc;"
| 69
| August 6
| Portland
| 
| Michael Porter Jr. (27)
| Michael Porter Jr. (12)
| Nikola Jokić (13)
| Visa Athletic CenterNo In-Person Attendance
| 45–24
|- style="background:#cfc;"
| 70
| August 8
| Utah
| 
| Nikola Jokić (30) 
| Jamal Murray (12)
| Jamal Murray (8)
| The ArenaNo In-Person Attendance
| 46–24
|- style="background:#fcc;"
| 71
| August 10
| @ L. A. Lakers
| 
| PJ Dozier (18)
| Bol Bol (5)
| Mason Plumlee (5)
| The ArenaNo In-Person Attendance
| 46–25
|- style="background:#fcc;"
| 72
| August 12
| L. A. Clippers
| 
| Jerami Grant (25)
| Nikola Jokić (7) 
| Nikola Jokić (13) 
| The ArenaNo In-Person Attendance
| 46–26
|- style="background:#fcc;"
| 73
| August 14
| @ Toronto
| 
| PJ Dozier (20)
| Bates-Diop, Morris (6)
| PJ Dozier (8)
| HP Field HouseNo In-Person Attendance
| 46–27

|- style="background:"
| -
| March 13
| @ San Antonio
| 
| 
| 
| 
| AT&T Center
|
|- style="background:"
| -
| March 15
| @ L.A. Lakers
| 
| 
| 
| 
| Staples Center
|
|- style="background:"
| -
| March 18
| L.A. Clippers
| 
| 
| 
| 
| Pepsi Center
|
|- style="background:"
| -
| March 20
| @ Oklahoma City
| 
| 
| 
| 
| Chesapeake Energy Arena
|
|- style="background:"
| -
| March 22
| @ Toronto
| 
| 
| 
| 
| Scotiabank Arena
|
|- style="background:"
| -
| March 23
| @ Chicago
| 
| 
| 
| 
| United Center
|
|- style="background:"
| -
| March 25
| @ Miami
| 
| 
| 
| 
| American Airlines Arena
|
|- style="background:"
| -
| March 27
| San Antonio
| 
| 
| 
| 
| Pepsi Center
|
|- style="background:"
| -
| March 30
| Oklahoma City
| 
| 
| 
| 
| Pepsi Center
|
|- style="background:"
| -
| March 31
| Golden State
| 
| 
| 
| 
| Chase Center
|
|- style="background:"
| -
| April 3
| Chicago
| 
| 
| 
| 
| Pepsi Center
|
|- style="background:"
| -
| April 5
| Utah
| 
| 
| 
| 
| Pepsi Center
|
|- style="background:"
| -
| April 7
| Memphis
| 
| 
| 
| 
| Pepsi Center
|
|- style="background:"
| -
| April 9
| @ Portland
| 
| 
| 
| 
| Moda Center
|
|- style="background:"
| -
| April 11
| Sacramento
| 
| 
| 
| 
| Pepsi Center
|
|- style="background:"
| -
| April 13
| Dallas
| 
| 
| 
| 
| Pepsi Center
|
|- style="background:"
| -
| April 14
| @ Utah
| 
| 
| 
| 
| Vivint Smart Home Arena
|

Playoffs 

|- bgcolor=#cfc
| 1
| August 17
| Utah
| 
| Jamal Murray (36)
| Nikola Jokić (10)
| Jamal Murray (9)
| HP Field HouseNo in-person attendance
| 1–0
|- bgcolor=#fcc
| 2
| August 19
| Utah
| 
| Jokić, Porter (28)
| Nikola Jokić (11)
| Nikola Jokić (6)
| The ArenaNo in-person attendance
| 1–1
|- bgcolor=#fcc
| 3
| August 21
| @ Utah
| 
| Nikola Jokić (15)
| Dozier, Plumlee (6)
| Jokić, Murray (6)
| The ArenaNo in-person attendance
| 1–2
|- bgcolor=#fcc
| 4
| August 23
| @ Utah
| 
| Jamal Murray (50)
| Jamal Murray (11)
| Jamal Murray (7)
| The ArenaNo in-person attendance
| 1–3
|- bgcolor=#cfc
| 5
| August 25
| Utah
| 
| Jamal Murray (42)
| Jamal Murray (8)
| Jamal Murray (8)
| HP Field HouseNo in-person attendance
| 2–3
|- bgcolor=#cfc
| 6
| August 30
| @ Utah
| 
| Jamal Murray (50)
| Michael Porter Jr. (12)
| Nikola Jokić (9)
| The ArenaNo in-person attendance
| 3–3
|- bgcolor=#cfc
| 7
| September 1
| Utah
| 
| Nikola Jokić (30)
| Nikola Jokić (14)
| Monté Morris (5)
| The ArenaNo in-person attendance
| 4–3

|- bgcolor=#fcc
| 1
| September 3
| @ L. A. Clippers
| 
| Nikola Jokić (15)
| Paul Millsap (9)
| Jamal Murray (6)
| AdventHealth ArenaNo in-person attendance
| 0–1
|- bgcolor=#cfc
| 2
| September 5
| @ L. A. Clippers
| 
| Jamal Murray (27)
| Nikola Jokić (18)
| Jamal Murray (6)
| AdventHealth ArenaNo in-person attendance
| 1–1
|- bgcolor=#fcc
| 3
| September 7
| L. A. Clippers
| 
| Nikola Jokić (32)
| Nikola Jokić (12)
| Jamal Murray (9)
| AdventHealth ArenaNo in-person attendance
| 1–2
|- bgcolor=#fcc
| 4
| September 9
| L. A. Clippers
| 
| Nikola Jokić (26)
| Nikola Jokić (11)
| Jamal Murray (7)
| AdventHealth ArenaNo in-person attendance
| 1–3
|- bgcolor=#cfc
| 5
| September 11
| @ L. A. Clippers
| 
| Jamal Murray (26)
| Nikola Jokić (14)
| Jamal Murray (7)
| HP Field HouseNo in-person attendance
| 2–3
|- bgcolor=#cfc
| 6
| September 13
| L. A. Clippers
| 
| Nikola Jokić (34)
| Nikola Jokić (14)
| Nikola Jokić (7)
| AdventHealth ArenaNo in-person attendance
| 3–3
|- bgcolor=#cfc
| 7
| September 15
| @ L. A. Clippers
| 
| Jamal Murray (40)
| Nikola Jokić (22)
| Nikola Jokić (13)
| AdventHealth ArenaNo in-person attendance
| 4–3

|- style="background:#fcc;"
| 1
| September 18
| @ L. A. Lakers
| 
| Jokić, Murray (21)
| Michael Porter Jr. (10)
| Jamal Murray (5)
| The ArenaNo In-Person Attendance
| 0–1
|- style="background:#fcc;"
| 2
| September 20
| @ L. A. Lakers
| 
| Nikola Jokić (30)
| Paul Millsap (8)
| Nikola Jokić (9)
| The ArenaNo In-Person Attendance
| 0–2
|- style="background:#cfc;"
| 3
| September 22
| L. A. Lakers
| 
| Jamal Murray (28)
| Nikola Jokić (10)
| Jamal Murray (12)
| The ArenaNo In-Person Attendance
| 1–2
|- style="background:#fcc;"
| 4
| September 24
| L. A. Lakers
| 
| Jamal Murray (32)
| Michael Porter Jr. (8)
| Jamal Murray (8)
| The ArenaNo In-Person Attendance
| 1–3
|- style="background:#fcc;"
| 5
| September 26
| @ L. A. Lakers
| 
| Grant, Jokić (20)
| Jerami Grant (9)
| Jamal Murray (8)
| The ArenaNo In-Person Attendance
| 1–4

Player statistics

Regular season

|- align="center" bgcolor=""
| 
| 58 || 58 || style=|33.0 || .450 || .375 || .767 || 6.3 || 3.7 || 1.1 || .5 || 15.1
|- align="center" bgcolor=""
| 
| 7 || 0 || 14.0 || .464 || .333 || .800 || 2.4 || .0 || .3 || .6 || 5.3
|- align="center" bgcolor=""
| 
| 41 || 0 || 18.2 || .389 || .360 || .868 || 1.9 || 1.2 || .8 || .1 || 7.9
|- align="center" bgcolor=""
| 
| 7 || 0 || 12.4 || .500 || .444 || .800 || 2.7 || .9 || .3 || style=|.9 || 5.7
|- align="center" bgcolor=""
| 
| 14 || 0 || 3.2 || .400 || .167 || style=|1.000 || .7 || .2 || .1 || .1 || 1.2
|- align="center" bgcolor=""
| 
| 2 || 0 || 9.5 || .500 || .000 || style=|1.000 || 2.0 || .0 || 1.0 || .0 || 2.0
|- align="center" bgcolor=""
| 
| 58 || 27 || 18.5 || .461 || .326 || .611 || 3.3 || .8 || .4 || .6 || 5.4
|- align="center" bgcolor=""
| 
| 6 || 0 || 12.7 || .357 || .300 || .000 || 1.0 || .5 || .5 || .0 || 4.3
|- align="center" bgcolor=""
| 
| 29 || 0 || 14.2 || .414 || .347 || .724 || 1.9 || 2.2 || .5 || .2 || 5.8
|- align="center" bgcolor=""
| 
| 71 || 24 || 26.6 || .478 || .389 || .750 || 3.5 || 1.2 || .7 || .8 || 12.0
|- align="center" bgcolor=""
| 
| 56 || 55 || 31.8 || .420 || .333 || .815 || 2.9 || 2.1 || style=|1.4 || .3 || 10.4
|- align="center" bgcolor=""
| 
| 34 || 0 || 12.4 || .345 || .250 || .640 || 2.8 || .6 || .1 || .1 || 3.1
|- align="center" bgcolor=""
| 
| style=|73 || style=|73 || 32.0 || .528 || .314 || .817 || style=|9.7 || style=|7.0 || 1.2 || .6 || style=|19.9
|- align="center" bgcolor=""
| 
| 4 || 0 || 8.0 || .333 || .500 || .750 || 1.3 || 1.0 || .5 || .3 || 2.3
|- align="center" bgcolor=""
| 
| 51 || 48 || 24.3 || .482 || .435 || .816 || 5.7 || 1.6 || .9 || .6 || 11.6
|- align="center" bgcolor=""
| 
| style=|73 || 12 || 22.4 || .459 || .378 || .843 || 1.9 || 3.5 || .8 || .2 || 9.0
|- align="center" bgcolor=""
| 
| 59 || 59 || 32.3 || .456 || .346 || .881 || 4.0 || 4.8 || 1.1 || .3 || 18.5
|- align="center" bgcolor=""
| 
| 61 || 1 || 17.3 || .615 || .000 || .535 || 5.2 || 2.5 || .5 || .6 || 7.2
|- align="center" bgcolor=""
| 
| 55 || 8 || 16.4 || .509 || .422 || .833 || 4.7 || .8 || .5 || .5 || 9.3
|- align="center" bgcolor=""
| 
| 9 || 0 || 4.6 || .714 || .000 || .000 || .9 || .2 || .3 || .1 || 1.1
|- align="center" bgcolor=""
| 
| 7 || 0 || 4.3 || style=|.833 || style=|1.000 || .500 || 1.1 || .3 || .0 || .0 || 1.9
|}

Playoffs

|- align="center" bgcolor=""
| 
| 5 || 0 || 4.8 || .200 || .000 || .500 || 1.2 || .2 || .0 || .0 || .6
|- align="center" bgcolor=""
| 
| 4 || 0 || 5.3 || .556 || .667 || .875 || 1.3 || .0 || .5 || .5 || 4.8
|- align="center" bgcolor=""
| 
| 1 || 4.0 || .000 || .000 || .000 || 2.0 || .0 || .0 || .0 || .0 || .0
|- align="center" bgcolor=""
| 
| 19 || 3 || 19.7 || .423 || .262 || .692 || 3.3 || .7 || .4 || .4 || 4.5
|- align="center" bgcolor=""
| 
| 6 || 0 || 5.0 || .500 || .500 || .500 || .5 || .3 || .0 || .0 || 2.7
|- align="center" bgcolor=""
| 
| 12 || 0 || 10.4 || .424 || .250 || .571 || 1.5 || 1.0 || .2 || .2 || 3.2
|- align="center" bgcolor=""
| 
| 19 || 16 || 34.4 || .406 || .326 || .889 || 3.3 || 1.3 || .6 || .8 || 11.6
|- align="center" bgcolor=""
| 
| 14 || 12 || 27.1 || .378 || .365 || .773 || 2.0 || 1.7 || 1.1 || .3 || 7.4
|- align="center" bgcolor=""
| 
| 19 || 19 || 35.5 || .519 || .429 || .835 || 9.8 || 5.7 || 1.1 || .8 || 24.4
|- align="center" bgcolor=""
| 
| 19 || 19 || 24.2 || .398 || .341 || .796 || 4.7 || 1.2 || .6 || .5 || 8.0
|- align="center" bgcolor=""
| 
| 19 || 4 || 21.4 || .496 || .300 || .824 || 1.5 || 2.7 || .6 || .1 || 9.1
|- align="center" bgcolor=""
| 
| 19 || 19 || 39.6 || .505 || .453 || .897 || 4.8 || 6.6 || .9 || .3 || 26.5
|- align="center" bgcolor=""
| 
| 19 || 0 || 10.9 || .487 || .000 || .667 || 3.2 || 1.3 || .2 || .4 || 2.4
|- align="center" bgcolor=""
| 
| 19 || 3 || 23.8 || .476 || .382 || .743 || 6.7 || .8 || .7 || .3 || 11.4
|- align="center" bgcolor=""
| 
| 1 || 0 || 3.0 || .000 || .000 || .000 || .0 || .0 || .0 || .0 || .0
|}

Transactions

Trades

Contracts

Re-signed

Additions

Subtractions

References

Denver Nuggets seasons
Denver Nuggets
Denver Nuggets
Denver Nuggets